The Central Mechanical Engineering Research Institute (also known as CSIR-CMERI Durgapur or CMERI Durgapur) is a public engineering research and development institution in Durgapur, West Bengal, India. It is a constituent laboratory of the Indian Council of Scientific and Industrial Research (CSIR). This institute is the only national level research institute in the field of mechanical engineering in India.

The CMERI was founded in February 1958 under the endorsement of the CSIR. It was founded to develop national mechanical engineering technology, particularly in order to help Indian industries. During its first decade, the CMERI mainly focused its efforts towards national technology and import substitution. Currently, the institute is making R&D efforts in the front-line areas of research such as Robotics, Mechatronics, Microsystem, Cybernetics, Manufacturing, Precision agriculture, Embedded system, Near net shape manufacturing and Biomimetics. Besides conducting research, the institute works towards different R&D based mission mode programs of country to provide suitable technological solutions for poverty alleviation, societal improvement, energy security, food security, aerospace, mining, automobile and defense.

Campus

CMERI has one office campus and three residential campuses in Durgapur. Office campus spans in an area of 81 acres with more than 16 buildings. The campus is located 7.80 kilometers from Durgapur railway station and 1.6 kilometers from Durgapur City Center. The campus is adjacent to National Institute of Technology, Durgapur and National Power Training Institute, Durgapur. An extension center of CMERI, Durgapur is situated in Bardhaman District, an industrial town of West Bengal.

Three residential campuses extended over 72 acres of land and has civic amenities like Staff Quarters, Scientist Apartments, Children Park, Health Center, Staff Club, Guest Houses, Executive Hostels, Academic Hall of Residence, Dispensary, Market, Gymkhana and Schools. Kendriya Vidyalaya is situated inside the campus for providing the education from primary to higher secondary students and meant mainly for ward of the employees. A state-funded free primary school named Shishu Bani is also available in the campus to serve the educational need of nearby poor people. The institute also runs a free children computer training center named CSIR Kids' i-zone, which is situated in the colony campus.

This institute has an extension centre named as CMERI-Centre of Excellence for Farm Machinery situated at Ludhiana in Punjab.

Achievements 
The CMERI has developed as many as many products and processes, out of which 26 have been awarded prestigious national awards. The CMERI has filed more than 100 patents. Over 120 licensees have learned from the institute's products and processes for commercial exploitation.

During 1956–1962, Man Mohan Suri, the then director of CMERI, has developed a novel concept of an integrated power pack involving reverse-governing techniques for the diesel engine superimposed on a hydro-mechanical transmission called Suri-Transmission. This has resulted in substantially increasing the efficiency of diesel locomotives. Suri-Transmission and its improvements are covered by 36 patents in 11 major countries.

In the mid-sixties, the Green Revolution triggered large-scale tractor usage in India. To meet this growing demand in 1965, CMERI initiated a project for design and development of 35 HP tractor based on indigenous know how. The developed tractor technology has been named as Swaraj by Indira Gandhi (the then Prime Minister of India). 
Recently, the institute developed the Soleckshaw electric rickshaw under the CSIR-800 community project program, with the aim of reducing the carbon footprint of the city and simultaneously mitigating the drudgery of the manual rickshaw puller. The institute in collaboration of West Bengal Renewable Energy Development Agency (WBREDA), also developed a smart card based prepaid energy meter for use with renewal energy sources. Scientists of the institute have developed India's first cricket-ball stitching machine to bring uniformity in cricket balls and repeatability in performance.

The institute is one of the nodal points of National Knowledge Network connectivity program under multi-gigabit pan-India network to share intellectual property and knowledge-base among premier R&D labs/institutes/universities of the country.

Notable Technologies Developed
 Suri Transmission
 Coil Expanding & Spreading Machine
 Automatic submerged arc welding machine
 Hydraulic Bolt Tensioner
 Portable oxy-gas cutting machine
 TIG cutting machine
 Cable Making Machine
 Calendar Sealing Machine
 Hand Pump Attachable Iron Removal Plant
 Swaraj 35 HP Tractor
 Sonalika Tractor
 Deep Sea-bed Mining System
 Remotely Operated Vehicle
 Spouted Bed Dryer
 Fluidized Bed Dryer
 50 TPD Oil Expeller
 Placer Sand Mining System
 Mark II Hand Pump 
 Rotillor 
 Single Spindle Automatic Turret Lathe
 SPM for Automatic Reaming of Bores
 Electric Slag Refining Plant 
 Friction Welding Machine & TIG Cutting Torch 
 Self Propelled Combine Harvester
Inter Row Rotary Cultivator for Wide Row Crops
 SPM for Manufacturing of Globoidal Cam Indexing Units
 SCARA Manipulator of 60 kg Payload
 Vision Guided Robotic System
 Radio Frequency Quadruple (RFQ) LINAC
 Design and Analysis of high ‘Q’ 75 MHz Radio Frequency (RF) Cavity for DRIFT Tube LINAC
 Fluidised Bed Dryer for Oilseeds
 1 TPD Oil Expeller
 Epoxy Concrete Technology
 Process Development for manufacture of ADI crankshaft for cars and single cylinder agricultural pump engines
 Autonomous Underwater Vehicle (AUV-150)
 Sub-Terrain Robot
 All Terrain Robot
 Five Axis µ-CNC Milling Machine
 Reconfigurable Micro Factory Test Bed
 600 Litre/Day Capacity Semi Continuous Type Biodiesel Plant
 A Prepaid Smart Card Operated Electronic Energy Meter with Online Load Optimizer for Solar Power Application
 Orientation Unit for a Fruit Sorting and Grading Machine
 Mobile Bridge Inspection Unit
 Pneumatic Precision Planter for Vegetables
 Domestic Type Filtration unit for defluoridation of drinking water
 Appropriate Mechanization Project at the Durgapur Steel Plant
 Remotely Operated Vehicle (ROV): 500 m Depth Qualification
 Design & development of Auitonomous Mobile Robot
 Autonomous Intelligent Robotic Wheel Chair  
 Design and Development of Outdoor Mobile Robot
 Teleoperated Rotary-Wing Aerial Robot (RWAR)
 Colposcope- a Medical Device
 Plasma Disposal of Plastic Waste and Generation of Syngas for Power Generation
 Washing Unit for Freshly Harvested Ginger/Turmeric
 Improved Cabinet Dryer for Ginger & Turmeric
 Agricultural Implements
 Krishi Shakti Tractor 10 HP Tractor
 Soleckshaw-Solar Electric Rickshaw
 Improved Iron Removal Plant
 Solar Power Tree
 Oxygen Enrichment Unit

Awards and Accolades
 1961: Padma Shri, Recipient Shri Man Mohan Suri
 1962: Shanti Swarup Bhatnagar Prize for Science and Technology, Recipient Shri Man Mohan Suri
 2003: "We Think for India" Award, Recipient, Dr. Gopal P. Sinha et al.
 2003: SAIL Gold Medal, Recipient Dr. Gopal P. Sinha
 2013: CSIR Technology Award for Portable Colposcopy
 2017: CSIR Technology Award for Improved Iron Removal Plant and its implementation in Rural Areas

Extension Centre

The CMERI Centre of Excellence for Farm Machinery (CMERI-CoEFM) (Erstwhile MERADO), Gill Road, Ludhiana, Punjab. The CMERI-CoEFM was established as Mechanical Engineering Research & Development Organization (MERADO) at Ludhiana as an extension center of CMERI to concentrate on the technology development and expertise needs of around 65,000 small & medium scale industries, concentrated in and around Ludhiana, Punjab. In the past, a major component of R&D carried out at this center has gone in towards the development of appropriate machinery for productivity enhancement in the agricultural and the post-harvest processing sectors. A series of oil expellers of different capacity (from 1TPD to 50TPD) are developed with a patented technology to produce pungent oil from mustard seed, which was released to a number of industries. In the industrial front, the center developed many products ranging from single needle flat bed & post bed leather sewing machine and high speed safety stitching industrial sewing machine for the textile industry, brick moulding machine for the construction industry, radial drilling machine, friction welding machine, and rough terrain forklift truck for the manufacturing industry.

This extension center of CMERI, Durgapur is now concentrating on precision farming, multi-cropping and productivity improvement of available land, that would lead to conservation of seed, water and fertilizer through the development of advanced farm machinery equipped with advanced sensors.

At present, the major R&D thrust of this center is directed towards the exploration of various sources of bio-fuels and perfecting its extraction technology. CMERI-CoEFM has taken initiative for development of small biodiesel plant suitable for farmers in rural sector. The center also has started experiments for utilization of de-oiled cakes for generation of bio-gas, which can be used by farmers for self-reliance in energy.

Academics
The institute offers integrated M.Tech.-PhD. programmes from the Academy of Scientific and Innovative Research in New Delhi in Mechatronics, and applied and Computational Mechanics. New Postgraduate diploma Program  in Robotics, Maintenance Engineering and Advanced Manufacturing Technology are being offered with a target to provide in-depth exposure to the engineering concepts, scientific principles, implementation methodology and hands-on experience to freshers and Industry professionals. Other on-demand short-term courses are also arranged in the area of mechanical engineering and allied discipline. The CMERI offers opportunities to do projects twice a year for B.E./ B.Tech./ M.C.A./ M.Tech. to students from reputed engineering colleges like IITs, NITs etc. in Robotics, Information Technology, Mechanical Engineering, Electronics, Computer Science, Mechatronics and Material Science.

Further reading

References

External links
 

Scientific organisations based in India
Council of Scientific and Industrial Research
Education in Durgapur, West Bengal
Research institutes in West Bengal
Mechanical engineering organizations
1958 establishments in West Bengal
Research institutes established in 1958